Ulmi may refer to several places in Romania:

 Ulmi, a commune in Dâmbovița County
 Ulmi, a commune in Giurgiu County
 Ulmi, a village in Belcești Commune, Iași County
 Ulmi, a village in Milcov Commune, Olt County
 Ulmi, a district in the town of Urlați, Prahova County